Majalleh-ye Estebdad (Persian:The Journal of Despotism) was a satirical magazine based in Tehran, Iran. It was one of the publications founded following the Iranian Constitutional Revolution such as Nasim-e-Shomal and Sur-e Esrafil.

History and profile
Majalleh-ye Estebdad was launched in Tehran in 1907. The founder was Sheikh Mehdi of Qom, known as Sheikh al-Mamalek, who also edited the magazine. The first issue appeared on 16 July 1907. It was a hand-printed publication. For the issues 1–17 the format of the magazine was 16.5x20.5 centimeters, whereas for the issues 18–34 it was 10x16.5 centimeters.

Although it existed during the Iranian Constitutional Revolution it was neither a supporter of it nor an anti-constitution publication. Instead, it narrated events in the course of the revolution using satire. However, the magazine did not publish any cartoon or caricature.

The last issue numbered 34 appeared on 24 April 1908.

References

1907 establishments in Iran
1908 establishments in Iran
Defunct magazines published in Iran
Defunct political magazines
Iranian political satire
Magazines established in 1907
Magazines disestablished in 1908
Magazines published in Tehran
Persian-language magazines
Satirical magazines